Barbara Stizzoli (born 29 May 1969) is an Italian sports shooter. She competed in two events at the 1996 Summer Olympics.

References

External links
 

1969 births
Living people
Italian female sport shooters
Olympic shooters of Italy
Shooters at the 1996 Summer Olympics
People from Tolmezzo
Sportspeople from Friuli-Venezia Giulia